Dov Zakin (1922 – 4 September 1986) was an Israeli politician who served as a member of the Knesset for the Alignment and Mapam between 1969 and 1977 and again from 1981 to 1984.

Biography
Dov Zakin was born in Baranavichy in Poland (present-day Belarus).  Zakin made aliyah to Mandatory Palestine in 1937. He was educated at the Ben Shemen Youth Village, before studying political science and economics at Tel Aviv University.

In 1945 he was amongst the founders of kibbutz Lehavot HaBashan.

Political career
In 1946, he helped found the Wadi Ara branch of the Eretz Yisrael Workers Union. In 1950, 1952 and 1963 he travelled to the United States as an emissary for Hashomer Hatzair, and between 1959 and 1961 served as secretary of the Peace Movement.

A member of the Mapam secretariat, he was elected to the Knesset on the Alignment list (an alliance of Mapam and the Labor Party) in 1969.

In 1970, while visiting the United States, he met with State Department officials, Joseph Sisco and Undersecretary of State Roger Davies, who assured him that America would "not abandon or jeopardize the security of Israel.”

He was re-elected in 1973, and in 1977 was part of the Mapam faction that briefly broke away from the Alignment. He lost his seat in the 1977 elections, but returned to the Knesset after the 1981 elections.

He lost his seat for a final time in 1984.

In 1986 he became a member of the board of directors of the World Zionist Organization.

References

External links

1922 births
1986 deaths
People from Baranavichy
People from Nowogródek Voivodeship (1919–1939)
Belarusian Jews
Polish emigrants to Mandatory Palestine
Jews in Mandatory Palestine
Israeli people of Belarusian-Jewish descent
Alignment (Israel) politicians
Mapam politicians
Members of the 7th Knesset (1969–1974)
Members of the 8th Knesset (1974–1977)
Members of the 10th Knesset (1981–1984)
Tel Aviv University alumni